Floyd Joseph Egan (April 6, 1896 – 1967) was an American football and basketball coach.  He served as the head football coach of Trinity College—now known as Duke University—in 1920, compiling a record of 4–0–1.  Egan was also the head basketball coach at New York University (NYU) for one season, in 1918–19, and at Trinity for the 1920–21 season, tallying a career college basketball record of 14–12.

Head coaching record

Football

Basketball

References

1896 births
1967 deaths
American football ends
American men's basketball players
Basketball players from New York City
Basketball coaches from New York (state)
College men's track and field athletes in the United States
Guards (basketball)
Duke Blue Devils football coaches
Duke Blue Devils men's basketball coaches
NYU Violets baseball players
NYU Violets football players
NYU Violets men's basketball coaches
NYU Violets men's basketball players
Sportspeople from Brooklyn